Madhupur is an upazila of Tangail District in the Division of Dhaka, Bangladesh.

Geography
It has 74984 households and total area of 500.67 km2. It has a large forest area named 'Madhupurer Gor". Madhupur is famous throughout the country for delicious pineapples. Madhupur is bounded by Jamalpur Sadar upazila on the north, Gopalpur and Ghatail upazilas on the south, Muktagachha and Fulbaria upazilas on the east. Sarishabari and Gopalpur upazilas on west. Main rivers are Jhinai, Bangshi, Banar and Atrai.

Demographics
As of the 2011 Bangladesh census, Madhupur has a population of 296,729. Males constitute 51.13% of the population, and females 48.87%. Madhupur has an average literacy rate of 41.2% (Male-42.7% & Female-39.7)

Economy

Land use Total land cultivable 32900 hectares, fallow land 2000 hectares; land under irrigation 65%.

Value of land The market value of the land of the first grade is Tk 10000 per 0.01 hectare.
Main crops are paddy, jute, wheat, cotton, potato, patal, ginger, betel leaf, kasava and vegetables.
Extinct and nearly extinct crops Indigo, varieties of pulses and aman paddy. Main fruits are mango, jackfruit, litchi, papaya, pineapple and olive.

Fisheries, dairies, poultries Fishery 18, dairy 28, poultry 103, hatchery 1.
Communication facilities Roads: pucca 150 km, semi pucca 19 km; waterways 32 nautical mile.
Traditional transport Palanquin (extinct).

Manufactories Silk mill 1, rice and flour mill 53, ice factory 17, lathe & welding 63, saw mill 109, bakery 7 and bidi factory 1.

Cottage industries Weaving 27, goldsmith 103, blacksmith 26, bamboo work 320, potteries 43, wood work 42, tailoring 216; apiculture by private initiative.
Hats, bazars Hats and bazars are 45, most noted of which are Madhupur, Dhanbari and Garo Hat; fairs 3 (Sholakudi Mela, Dhanbari Baishakhi Mela & Dhalpur Boishakhi Mela).

The main exports are pineapple, silk, cotton, jackfruit and honey.
NGO activities Operationally important NGOs are brac, asa, Proshika and caritas, World Tourist Mission, Family and Child Welfare Centre, World Vision Bangladesh.

Administration
Madhupur Upazila is divided into Madhupur Municipality and six union parishads: Alokdia, Arankhola, Ausnara, Golabari, Mirzabari, and Sholakuri. The union parishads are subdivided into 111 mauzas and 180 villages.

Madhupur Municipality is subdivided into 9 wards and 23 mahallas.

Photo gallery

Education
 Pirgacha Saint Pauls High School
 Gangair Ahammad Ali Memorial High School
 Courpus Christy Primary School and High School
 Madhupur Shahid Smrity Higher Secondary School
 Alokdia High School
 Madhupur College
 Madhupur Rani Bhabani Model High School
 Madhupur Bahumukhi Model Technical Institute
 Brahminbari High School

Notable residents
 Edric Baker, medical doctor, ran a low cost health clinic in the upazila from 1996 until his death in 2015.

Notable residents
 Edric Baker, medical doctor, ran a low cost health clinic in the upazila from 1996 until his death in 2015.
 Dokhala Forest Jame Mosque
 Jalchatra Bazaar, Bangladesh
 Madhupur, Bangladesh
 Upazilas of Bangladesh
 Districts of Bangladesh
 Divisions of Bangladesh
 Madhupur National Park,Deer Breeding Center,Tourist tower

References

 
Upazilas of Tangail District